The 2000 Rutgers Scarlet Knights football team represented Rutgers University in the 2000 NCAA Division I-A football season. The Scarlet Knights were led by fifth-year head coach Terry Shea and played their home games at Rutgers Stadium. They were a member of the Big East Conference. They finished the season 3–8, 0–7 in Big East play to finish in last place.

Schedule

Roster

References

Rutgers
Rutgers Scarlet Knights football seasons
Rutgers Scarlet Knights football